The 1933 West Virginia Mountaineers football team was an American football team that represented West Virginia University as an independent during the 1933 college football season. In its third season under head coach Greasy Neale, the team compiled a 3–5–3 record and was outscored by opponents by a total of 145 to 87. The team played its home games at Mountaineer Field in Morgantown, West Virginia. Arthur Swisher was the team captain.

Schedule

References

West Virginia
West Virginia Mountaineers football seasons
West Virginia Football